Chalcostigma is a genus of South American hummingbirds in the family Trochilidae.

Taxonomy and species list
The genus Chalcostigma was introduced in 1854 by the German naturalist Ludwig Reichenbach. The type species was subsequently designated as the bronze-tailed thornbill by George Gray. The name of the genus is derived from the  Greek khalkos meaning bronze and stigme for a spot or mark, a reference to the beard on the bronze-tailed thornbill.

The genus contains the following five species:
 Rufous-capped thornbill (Chalcostigma ruficeps)
 Olivaceous thornbill (Chalcostigma olivaceum)
 Blue-mantled thornbill (Chalcostigma stanleyi)
 Bronze-tailed thornbill (Chalcostigma heteropogon)
 Rainbow-bearded thornbill (Chalcostigma herrani)

References

 
Bird genera
Taxonomy articles created by Polbot
Taxa named by Ludwig Reichenbach